Lee Hwi-jae (born Lee Young-jae on December 29, 1972) is a South Korean TV presenter, comedian, actor, and singer. Lee studied theater at the Seoul Institute of the Arts, then made his TV debut in 1992 as a comedian after working as a floor director for MBC's entertainment program Sunday, Sunday Night. He shot to stardom in the program Life Theater. Since then, he has expanded his career to hosting variety shows such as Sang Sang Plus, Sponge and Quiz to Change the World. He was the third highest-paid entertainer at MBC in 2008, earning .

Personal life
Hwi-jae married florist Moon Jeong-won at the Grand Hyatt Hotel in Seoul on December 5, 2010. Their twin sons, Lee Seo-eon and Lee Seo-jun, were born on March 15, 2013. He and his twins appeared in the variety show The Return of Superman from November 3, 2013 – April 14, 2018.

Filmography

Television series

Film

Variety Show

Hosting Events

Discography

Album

Song Contribution

Musical Theatre
March! Waikiki Brothers (2006)

Book
별난 사람들의 별나지 않은 그 집 이야기 (2010)

Awards and nominations

References

External links
Lee Hwi-jae Fan Cafe at Daum 

1972 births
Living people
Cube Entertainment artists
South Korean comedians
South Korean male film actors
South Korean male television actors